The Soldiers of Oxfordshire Museum is a military museum in the town of Woodstock, Oxfordshire, England, north of Oxford. The museum is on the edge of the Cotswolds.

History
Colonel Robin Evelegh, in whose memory the Evelegh Gallery is named, and Colonel Tim May both played a leading role in the idea and development of the £3.2 million museum which was opened by the Princess Royal in 2014. The museum was created to honour soldiers from Oxfordshire regiments and present their history. The museum is located in the grounds of The Oxfordshire Museum, with access through the entrance of that museum.

See also
 List of museums in Oxfordshire
 The Oxfordshire Museum
 Museum of Oxford

References

External links
 SOFO Museum website
 

2014 establishments in England
Museums established in 2014
History museums in Oxfordshire
Regimental museums in England
Military history of Oxfordshire
Woodstock, Oxfordshire